Hamdan El-Tayeb (born 1 January 1934) is a Sudanese sprinter. He competed in the men's 100 metres at the 1960 Summer Olympics.

References

External links
 

1934 births
Living people
Athletes (track and field) at the 1960 Summer Olympics
Sudanese male sprinters
Olympic athletes of Sudan
People from Sennar (state)